Kanavan is a 1968 Indian Tamil-language film, directed by P. Neelakantan, starring M. G. Ramachandran and Jayalalithaa, with C. R. Vijayakumari, S. A. Ashokan, Cho among others. It was released on 15 August 1968.

Plot 

Vellaiya is falsely accused for murdering cashier Ganapathy. Meanwhile. Rani a wealthy daughter of Chidambara Pillai, who hates marriages wand wants to be freed from humiliated Manogar, who comes to see Rani after Chidambara Pillai invitation. Manogar gets angry and insults Chidambara Pillai on Rani's behaviour. Chidambara Pillai, gets heart-attack and writes a will based on Manager Mani's advise and dies. To inherit, Rani has to marry in urgency. She chooses a person sentenced to death, the good Vellaiya. Vellaiya though reluctant initially,  he marries Rani. However, due to twist of incident, Vellaiya acquitted at the last minute, Vellaiya comes to settle down with his beautiful Rani. He has decided well to give her a lesson in the hardness of life.

Cast 

M. G. Ramachandran as Vellaiya
Jayalalithaa as Rani
S. A. Ashokan as Manager Mani
R. S. Manohar as Manogar
Cho Ramaswamy as Advocate Vardhan
C. R. Vijayakumari as Ponni, Velaiya's sister
Manorama as Thenmozhi, Vardhan's wife
Sundari Bai as Paruvadham, S. Paramasivam's wife.
Usilai Mani as Servant
Ennatha Kannaiya as the doctor
T. K. S. Natarajan as Prisoner
Shanmughasundari as Kaliyani
S. N. Parvathy as Neighbor
C. Vasantha as Azhagasan's wife
Justin as Nadjappa
S. Ramarao as Advocate S. Paramasivan B.A.B.L. Paruvadham's husband and Thenmozhi's father.
Trichy Soundarrajan as Chidhambaram Pillai, Rani's father.
"Sattaampillai" K. N. Venkatraman as the accountant of Chidhambaram Pilai
K. Kannan as Azhagesan
Thirupadhiswamy as Ponni's father-in-law
Vijayan as a lawyer
T. K. S. Chandran as Ponni's husband

Production 
The film was inspired by two narratives – the Russian novel Woodcutter and the English play The Taming of the Shrew by William Shakespeare.

Soundtrack 
The music was composed by M. S. Viswanathan.

Release 
Kanavan was released on 15 August 1968. When the film was released at Madurai's Thangam Theatre, gatecrashes and stampedes occurred, leading to three casualties. The film was dubbed into Hindi as Aakhri Nishan.

References

Bibliography

External links 

1960s Tamil-language films
1968 films
Films directed by P. Neelakantan
Films scored by M. S. Viswanathan